Lothian is a traditional region in Scotland.

Lothian or Lothan may also refer to:

Scotland
Lothian and Borders
East Lothian
West Lothian
Midlothian
Edinburgh
Lothian (Scottish Parliament electoral region)
and its predecessor, Lothians (Scottish Parliament electoral region)
NHS Lothian, national health service region

People
Marquess of Lothian
 Philip Kerr, 11th Marquess of Lothian (1882 - 1940) British politician specializing in foreign affairs
Albert Lothian, Scottish architect
Dan Lothian, American reporter for CNN
Elizabeth Inglis Lothian (1881 - 1973), Australian teacher of classics
Noel Lothian, Australian botanist
Lothan Cousins, Jamaican politician

Other uses
Lothian, Maryland, a community in the United States
Lothian Books, Melbourne, Australia